Bruno Xavier Almeida Costa (born 19 April 1997) is a Portuguese professional footballer who plays for FC Porto B as a midfielder or a right-back.

Club career

Porto
Born in Oliveira de Azeméis, Aveiro District, Costa joined FC Porto in 2009 at the age of 12, from C.D. Feirense. On 14 August 2016, he made his professional debut with the former's reserves in a 1–0 home win against Académico de Viseu F.C. in the LigaPro where he played 35 minutes. He scored his first goal in the competition on 22 October 2017, helping the hosts defeat Varzim S.C. 3–0.

Costa appeared in his first competitive match with the first team debut on 6 March 2018 in the last 16 of the UEFA Champions League away to Liverpool, a goalless draw in the second leg following a 5–0 loss at the Estádio do Dragão. His Primeira Liga bow took place on 13 April 2019, in a 3–0 away victory over Portimonense S.C. in which he was an 82nd-minute substitute for Yacine Brahimi.

Portimonense
It was reported on 8 January 2020 that Costa had signed for Portimonense also of the top division on loan for the rest of the season. Two days later, the Algarvean club's president confirmed this was instead an 18-month transfer. He made his debut on 11 January in a goalless home game with F.C. Paços de Ferreira, replacing Fernando Medeiros at half-time.

Costa joined Paços de Ferreira on 17 August 2020, on a season-long loan. He scored his first goal in the Portuguese top flight on 30 October, from a penalty in a 3–2 home defeat of former side Porto.

Return to Porto
Costa returned to Porto on 6 July 2021, agreeing to a three-year deal. In January 2022, following successive injuries to Wilson Manafá and João Mário, he was used by manager Sérgio Conceição as an emergency right-back.

International career
Costa earned the first of his three caps for Portugal at under-21 level on 25 May 2018, playing 45 minutes in the 3–2 friendly win over Italy in Estoril.

Honours
Porto
Primeira Liga: 2019–20, 2021–22
Taça de Portugal: 2019–20, 2021–22
Taça da Liga: 2022–23
Supertaça Cândido de Oliveira: 2022

References

External links

Portuguese League profile 

1997 births
Living people
People from Oliveira de Azeméis
Sportspeople from Aveiro District
Portuguese footballers
Association football midfielders
Primeira Liga players
Liga Portugal 2 players
FC Porto B players
FC Porto players
Portimonense S.C. players
F.C. Paços de Ferreira players
Portugal youth international footballers
Portugal under-21 international footballers